Francesville is a town in Salem Township, Pulaski County, in the U.S. state of Indiana. The population was 852 at the 2020 census. The motto for Francesville is “A small town with a big heart.”

History

Francesville was founded in 1853 when the railroad was extended to that point. The town was named for Frances Brooks, the daughter of a railroad official. A post office has been in operation at Francesville since 1853.

Mallon Building was listed on the National Register of Historic Places in 1999.

Geography

Demographics

2010 census
As of the census of 2010, there were 879 people, 353 households, and 259 families living in the town. The racial makeup of the town was 97.0% White, 0.2% African American, 0.7% Native American, 0.1% Asian, 0.3% from other races, and 1.6% from two or more races. Hispanic or Latino of any race were 3.6% of the population.

There were 353 households, of which 33.1% had children under the age of 18 living with them, 56.9% were married couples living together, 11.9% had a female householder with no husband present, 4.5% had a male householder with no wife present, and 26.6% were non-families. 24.6% of all households were made up of individuals, and 12.5% had someone living alone who was 65 years of age or older. The average household size was 2.49 and the average family size was 2.91.

The median age in the town was 39.6 years. 26.1% of residents were under the age of 18; 7% were between the ages of 18 and 24; 23.6% were from 25 to 44; 27% were from 45 to 64; and 16.4% were 65 years of age or older. The gender makeup of the town was 49.3% male and 50.7% female.

2000 census
As of the census of 2000, there were 905 people, 357 households, and 252 families living in the town. The racial makeup of the town was 97.68% White, 0.11% African American, 0.22% Asian, 0.33% from other races, and 1.66% from two or more races. Hispanic or Latino of any race were 1.33% of the population.

There were 357 households, out of which 33.9% had children under the age of 18 living with them, 59.7% were married couples living together, 7.8% had a female householder with no husband present, and 29.4% were non-families. 26.3% of all households were made up of individuals, and 13.4% had someone living alone who was 65 years of age or older. The average household size was 2.54 and the average family size was 3.09.

In the town, the population was spread out, with 27.5% under the age of 18, 6.6% from 18 to 24, 27.4% from 25 to 44, 20.4% from 45 to 64, and 18.0% who were 65 years of age or older. The median age was 37 years. For every 100 females, there were 94.6 males. For every 100 females age 18 and over, there were 91.3 males.

The median income for a household in the town was $39,464, and the median income for a family was $43,438. Males had a median income of $30,000 versus $20,341 for females. The per capita income for the town was $16,469. About 3.3% of families and 4.2% of the population were below the poverty line, including 2.2% of those under age 18 and 2.8% of those age 65 or over.

Education
The town has a lending library, the Francesville-Salem Township Public Library.

The K-12 students attend the West Central School Corporation, which serves the western half of Pulaski County and Gillam Township in adjacent Jasper County.

References

Towns in Pulaski County, Indiana
Towns in Indiana